Escobedo may refer to:

Places 
 , Cantabria, Spain
 General Escobedo, Nuevo León, Mexico
 Escobedo, Coahuila, Mexico
 Empalme Escobedo, Guanajuato, Mexico
 Pedro Escobedo, Querétaro, Mexico
 San Juanito de Escobedo (municipality), Jalisco, Mexico
 Tanquián de Escobedo, San Luis Potosí, Mexico
 Tultitlán de Mariano Escobedo, México State, Mexico
 Mariano Escobedo, Veracruz, Mexico
 Monte Escobedo, Zacatecas, Mexico

People with the surname 
 Anna Escobedo Cabral (born 1959), the 42nd Treasurer of the United States
 Bartolomé de Escobedo (c. 1500 - 1563), Spanish composer
 Carlos Escobedo, the founder of Spanish alternative rock band Savia
 Cleto Escobedo III, the founder of Cleto and the Cletones, the house band on Jimmy Kimmel Live!
 Eduardo Escobedo (born 1984), Mexican professional boxer and WBC Silver Super Featherweight Champion
 Ernesto Escobedo (born 1996), American tennis player
 Helen Escobedo (c. 1934 - 2010), Mexican sculptor and installation artist
 Jesus Escobedo (born 1966), Mexican professional wrestler
 José Antonio Chang Escobedo (born 1958), Prime Minister of Peru from September 2010 to March 2011
 Juan de Escobedo (c. 1530 - 1578), Spanish politician
 Marcos Escobedo (c. 1784 – 1833), Mexican military commander in the Mexican War of Independence, and later mayor of Colotlán, Jalisco
 Mariano Escobedo (c. 1826 - 1902), Mexican army general
 Marisela Ortiz Escobedo (1958–2010), Mexican social activist
  (†1493), Spanish notary on the first voyage of Christopher Columbus, taking minutes of the Discovery of America
 Vicente Escobedo (born 1981), Mexican-American boxer
 Xóchitl Escobedo (born 1968), Mexican tennis player

Other uses 
 Escobedo v. Illinois, 378 U.S. 478 (1964), a United States Supreme Court case dealing with criminal suspects' rights to counsel
 General Mariano Escobedo International Airport, an international airport located in Apodaca, Nuevo León, Mexico
 UM Escobedo, a Spanish football team based in Escobedo, Camargo, Cantabria, Spain